André Hoffmann (born 28 February 1993) is a German footballer who plays as a defensive midfielder for Fortuna Düsseldorf.

Career
Until 2010 he played in the youth system of MSV Duisburg before he was promoted in the summer of 2010.

On 3 January 2013, he left MSV Duisburg for Hannover 96. On 20 April 2013, he scored his first goal for Hannover 96 in a 1–6 defeat against FC Bayern Munich.

Honours
Individual
 Fritz Walter Medal U17 Silver: 2010
 Fritz Walter Medal U19 Silver: 2012

References

External links
 
 

1993 births
Living people
Association football midfielders
German footballers
Germany under-21 international footballers
Germany youth international footballers
MSV Duisburg II players
MSV Duisburg players
Hannover 96 players
Hannover 96 II players
Fortuna Düsseldorf players
2. Bundesliga players
Bundesliga players
Footballers from Essen